The 2010 BWF Grand Prix Gold and Grand Prix was the fourth season of BWF Grand Prix Gold and Grand Prix.

Schedule
Below is the schedule released by Badminton World Federation:

Results

Winners

Grand Prix Gold
India Open
June 8–June 13, Jawaharlal Nehru Stadium, Chennai, India.

Malaysia Open Grand Prix Gold
July 6–July 11, Johor Bahru City Stadium, Johor Bahru, Johor, Malaysia.

U.S. Open
July 19–24, Orange County Badminton Club, Orange County, California, United States.

Macau Open
July 27–August 1, Cotai Arena, Taipa, Macau.

Chinese Taipei Open
August 3–8, Taipei County Shinjuang Stadium, Taipei County, Republic of China (Taiwan).

Bitburger Open
August 31–September 5, Saarlandhalle, Saarbrücken, Germany.

Indonesia Open Grand Prix Gold
October 12–17, Palaran Samarinda, East Kalimantan, Indonesia.

Grand Prix
German Open
March 2–March 7, RWE Rhein-Ruhr Sporthalle, Mülheim, Germany.

Russian Open
June 29–July 4, Sports Hall Olympic, Vladivostok, Russia.

Australian Open
July 13–July 18, Melbourne Sports and Aquatic Centre, Melbourne, Australia.

Canadian Open
July 13–July 18, Richmond Oval, Richmond, Canada.

Vietnam Open
October 5–10, Phan Dinh Phung Stadium, Ho Chi Minh City, Vietnam.

Dutch Open
October 19–24, Topsportcentrum Almere, Almere, Netherlands.

Korea Grand Prix
November 23–28, Gimcheon City Indoor Stadium, Gimcheon, South Korea.

India Open Grand Prix
December 14–19, KVBR Indoor Stadium, Hyderabad, India.

References

Bwf Grand Prix Gold And Grand Prix, 2010
BWF Grand Prix Gold and Grand Prix